Territorial Assembly elections were held in Wallis and Futuna on 15 March 1997. 34 lists competed for the twenty seats in the Territorial Assembly of Wallis and Futuna. Assembly president Keleto Lakalaka was not re-elected.

Elections in four of the five constituencies were later annulled by the French Constitutional Council, with only Sigave's results withstanding scrutiny.

Elected members

References

Elections in Wallis and Futuna
1997 elections in Oceania
Territorial elections